Silhouettes is the third studio album by Dutch metal band Textures. It was released on May 5, 2008, by Listenable Records. The first single from the album, "Old Days Born Anew" was released digitally on 14 March 2008 to the band's MySpace. On 1 April 2008 the second single, "Storm Warning" was released. It was announced on 11 April 2008 that due to a manufacturing delay, the album would not be released until 5 May 2008, except in Benelux, where the album was released on 21 April 2008.

This is the second and last album to feature Eric Kalsbeek on vocals, the third and last album to feature Richard Rietdijk on synthesizer, and the first album to feature bassist Remko Tielemans.

Track listing
All Songs Written & Arranged By Textures.

Personnel
Textures
Eric Kalsbeek - vocals
Jochem Jacobs - guitar, backing vocals
Bart Hennephof - guitar, backing vocals
Richard Rietdijk - synthesizer, keyboards
Remko Tielemans - bass
Stef Broks - drums

Production
Jochem Jacobs - recording, mixing, mastering
Bart Hennephof - recording

External links
"Silhouettes" at discogs

Textures (band) albums
2008 albums
Listenable Records albums